Coelogyne corymbosa is a species of orchid.

corymbosa
Plants described in 1854